Arthur Edward Guest (7 November 1841 – 17 July 1898), was a British Conservative politician.

Background
Guest was the fifth son of Sir Josiah Guest, 1st Baronet, and Lady Charlotte Elizabeth, daughter of Albemarle Bertie, 9th Earl of Lindsey. Ivor Guest, 1st Baron Wimborne, and Montague Guest were his elder brothers.

Political career
Guest entered Parliament for Poole in 1868, a seat he held until 1874. He unsuccessfully contested Cardiff in 1880 and Southampton on 23 May 1888.

Family
Guest married Adeline Mary, daughter of David Barclay Chapman, in 1867. Guest died in July 1898, aged 56. Adeline Mary married as her second husband Cecil Maurice Chapman in 1899. She died in January 1931.

References

External links 
 

1841 births
1898 deaths
Younger sons of baronets
Conservative Party (UK) MPs for English constituencies
UK MPs 1868–1874
Arthur